Kai-Mei Fu is an American electrical engineer and physicist. They are an Associate Professor of Physics and Electrical Engineering at the University of Washington where they are the director of the Optical Spintronics and Sensing Lab.

Training, research, and notable achievements 

Fu received their A.B. in Physics at Princeton University (2000). They then went on to receive their Ph.D. (2007) at Stanford University with Yoshihisa Yamamoto. They  performed their postdoctoral training at the Information and Quantum System Laboratory at Hewlett-Packard Laboratories prior to joining the faculty at the University of Washington in 2011.

Fu has been a longstanding expert on topics concerning defects in crystals. Their research largely considers how understanding defects in materials can be applied towards applications in sensing, alongside the design of photonic devices. While their group addresses a series of different materials, they are considered a leading researcher on single crystal diamond with impurities.

Their research interests include Atomic Physics, Condensed Matter Experiment and Quantum Information.

At the University of Washington, they are active in topics concerning undergraduate research and outreach. They are the co-founder of the UW Science Explorers program in Seattle.

Fu is a founding member of the Molecular Engineering and Materials Center at the University of Washington. Their team has also received recent funding in Quantum Information Science from the National Science Foundation and the Department of Defense via the Ab-Initio Solid-State Quantum Materials MURI program. Fu is also one of the organizers of the newly founded Northwest Quantum Nexus, a research and industry coalition in the Pacific Northwest Region for research in Quantum Information Science. At the University of Washington, they are also a member of the QuantumX focus initiative.

Awards and honors 
 NSF CAREER Award (2012)
 Cottrell Scholar Award (2015)
 UW College of Engineering Junior Faculty Award (2015)

Notable publications

References 

American electrical engineers
American women physicists
Living people
Princeton University alumni
Stanford University alumni
University of Washington faculty
Year of birth missing (living people)
American women academics
21st-century American women